Vicky Parnov (born 24 October 1990 in Moscow, Soviet Union) is an Australian athlete who competes in pole vault. She is the current Australian national champion, winning in April 2012.  She has strong athletic pedigree, being the niece of Tatiana Grigorieva, who won the silver medal for Australia in the women's pole vault at the 2000 Summer Olympics, and the granddaughter of Natalya Pechonkina, who won the bronze medal for the USSR in the women's 400m at the 1968 Summer Olympics. She is coached by her father Alex Parnov, himself a former world class pole vaulter. Her younger sister Liz also competes in Pole Vault and was the Australian national champion in 2010 before she turned 16.

Vicky moved to Australia with her family in 1996, at the age of six, and was inspired to take up pole vaulting at the age of nine, after watching her aunt win a silver medal in the event at the Sydney Olympics. Her first international experience came at the age of 14, when she represented Australia at the 2005 World Youth Championships in Marrakesh, placing fourth. At the following edition of the championships, the 2007 World Youths, held in Ostrava, she won gold in the pole vault with a jump of 4.35m. She has also competed in two editions of the World Junior Championships, claiming the bronze medal in 2006, and represented Australia at open level during the 2006 Commonwealth Games in Melbourne, and the 2007 World Championships in Osaka. When she competed in the women's pole vault at the 2007 World Championships, she became the youngest athlete to ever represent Australia at World Championship level, aged 16 years and 305 days.

In 2007, she was selected Asics Junior Athlete of the Year.

Her personal best of 4.40 metres, achieved in June 2007 at Saulheim, was the Australian under-20 record until it was tied by her sister in April 2010 then surpassed in February 2012.

Achievements

See also
2007 World Championships in Athletics – Women's pole vault
Athletics in Australia

External links
IAAF profile for Vicky Parnov
Athletics Australia profile

Notes

1990 births
Living people
Australian female pole vaulters
Russian emigrants to Australia
Athletes from Moscow
Athletes (track and field) at the 2014 Commonwealth Games
Commonwealth Games competitors for Australia